The 1998 O'Byrne Cup was a Gaelic football competition played by the county teams of Leinster GAA.

The tournament was a straight knockout, with 12 teams. New rules were tested:
players cautioned for any pushing, pulling or holding of an opponent
two referees (in some games)
five substitutes
picking the ball off the ground permitted, so long as the player's feet are on the ground
"mark" or free kick for an overhead catch from a kick-out
solo run limited to one hop or one "solo"

Offaly were the winners, scoring two late goals to defeat Louth in the final at Drogheda Park.

Results

References

O'Byrne Cup
O'Byrne Cup